Luminato Festival, Toronto's International Festival of Arts and Ideas, is an annual celebration of the arts in Toronto, Ontario, Canada, launched in 2007. In its first decade, Luminato presented over 3,000 performances featuring 11,000 artists from over 40 countries and has commissioned over 80 new works of art.

History 
Luminato was founded by Tony Gagliano, Executive Chairman and CEO of St. Joseph Communications, and the late David Pecaut, CM Senior Partner at The Boston Consulting Group, in 2007. Janice Price was Luminato’s first CEO and remained in this position until November 2014. Anthony Sargent was appointed CEO in May 2015.

Chris Lorway was appointed the festival's first Artistic Director, until 2011 followed by Jörn Weisbrodt, a German arts administrator and past Director of Robert Wilson's Watermill Center, from September 2012 to June 2016. In July 2016, Josephine Ridge, former Creative Director of the Melbourne Festival and Executive Director of the Sydney Festival, was named Luminato’s new Artistic Director. In 2018, Naomi Campbell, who joined the festival as Company Manager in 2011 and then was appointed Luminato's first-ever Deputy Artistic Director in 2013, was named Luminato's Artistic Director in September 2018.

Funding
Luminato receives funding from sponsors, private donors, ticket sales, and various government agencies. In 2005, the Ontario Government committed $1 million in funding, which moved the project forward for the first festival. In 2008, the Ontario Government announced a series of strategic investments in the province's cultural industry. As part of that initiative, Luminato received $15 million, which was internally restricted by the board of directors towards commissioning future projects and securing first-performance rights from Canadian and international artists.

In 2007, L'Oréal was announced as Luminato's "exclusive presenting partner." This partnership has since been presented under the banner "Luminato /L'Oréal: Partners in Creativity."

References

Festivals in Toronto
Art festivals in Canada
Annual events in Toronto
Performing arts in Toronto